David Payne Brewster (June 15, 1801 – February 20, 1876) was an American lawyer and politician who served two terms as a U.S. Representative from New York from 1839 to 1843.

Biography
Born in Cairo, New York, Brewster attended the common schools and graduated from Union College, Schenectady, New York, in 1823. After that, he moved to New York City, where he studied law. In 1825, he was admitted to the bar and commenced practice in Oswego, New York.

Career
Brewster was a trustee of the Village of Oswego in 1828, 1836 and 1845; District Attorney of Oswego County from 1829 to 1833; Supervisor of the Town of Oswego in 1833; Treasurer of the Village of Oswego from 1832 to 1834; President of the Village of Oswego in 1837. He was also an associate judge of the court of Common Pleas from 1833 to 1841.

Tenure in Congress 
Brewster was elected as a Democrat to the 26th and 27th United States Congresses, holding office from March 4, 1839, to March 3, 1843.

Later career 
After his political career, Brewster was appointed as Postmaster of Oswego, New York, on July 21, 1845, and served until January 10, 1849, when his successor was appointed. Returning to the practice of law, he also engaged in agricultural pursuits. Brewster served as member of the excise board commission and became its president in 1870, and held the office for three years.

Death
Brewster died in Oswego, Oswego County, New York, February 20, 1876; and was interred at Riverside Cemetery, Scriba town, Oswego County, New York.

References

External links

Govtrack US Congress

1801 births
1876 deaths
Union College (New York) alumni
People from Cairo, New York
Democratic Party members of the United States House of Representatives from New York (state)
Politicians from Oswego, New York
19th-century American politicians
Oswego County District Attorneys